Horsey is a 1997 Canadian independent film starring Holly Ferguson and Todd Kerns that was directed by Kirsten Clarkson.  Described in its tagline as "A Gritty Tale of Love, Ambition, and Addiction", the film was the first film for actors Kerns and Ferguson, as well as for director and writer Kirsten Clarkson.  Although Ferguson would go on to act in several other films and TV series (including 2005's Dark Water), neither Kerns nor Clarkson would work on another film (as of 2007).

Plot
The film features Kerns, a Canadian rock musician famous for his work with Age of Electric, as a heroin-addicted artist and rocker named Ryland Yale.  Delilah Miller (Ferguson) is looking for an anchor in her life, and turns to Ryland as a stabilizing force.  However, she soon finds that he is possessive and undependable.  The film portrays the life and death struggles that ensue as Kerns faces addiction and Miller, a bisexual, tries to distance herself from Yale while also exploring her own emotional hangups.

Cast
 Holly Ferguson  as Delilah Miller
 Todd Kerns  as Ryland Yale
 Ryan Robbins  as Simon Leigh
 Victoria Deschanel  as Lily Hiroshima
 Madeleine Kipling  as Steffi Yale
 Tamara Rambaran  as Carol Muldoon
 Michael Roberds  as Manfred Fireburn
 Russ Hamilton as Jamie Alyosha
 Tara Lea  as Mrs. Black
 Laura Arcangeli  as Jane Yale

Notes
The film, which was a rookie effort by nearly all involved, received widespread distribution throughout Canada through Rogers Video, but received little critical acclaim. The film is primarily of sentimental interest to fans of Kerns' or Ferguson's other work, because it was the first major acting performance by both of them.

References

External links
 

1997 films
1997 drama films
Canadian independent films
1997 directorial debut films
Canadian drama films
1997 independent films
English-language Canadian films
1990s English-language films
1990s Canadian films